Novy Tevriz is a rural locality (a selo) in Kargasoksky District of Tomsk Oblast, Russia, located on the left bank of the Vasyugan River,  from Kargasok, the administrative center of the district.

It was founded by exiles from what is now Tevrizsky District in Omsk Oblast, who gave it its name, meaning "New Tevriz".

References

Notes

Sources

Rural localities in Tomsk Oblast